= Wrestling stable =

Wrestling stable may refer to:

- Stable (professional wrestling), in western pro wrestling, a group of wrestlers who compete as a team
- Sumo stable, or heya, a community of sumo wrestlers under the same trainer, and the premises where they train and live
